Upon This Rock is an album by Joe Farrell released in 1974.

In 2008 it returned to media attention when Farrell's daughter sued Kanye West, Method Man, Redman, Common and their respective record companies over alleged sampling of the title track.

Track listing

Side one
"Weathervane" (Joe Farrell) – 8:00
"I Won't Be Back" (Joe Beck) – 10:05

Side two
"Upon This Rock " (Joe Farrell) – 11:54
"Seven Seas" (Joe Beck) – 6:50

Personnel
Joe Farrell – tenor saxophone, soprano saxophone, flute
Herb Bushler – bass
Joe Beck – guitar
Jimmy Madison – drums
Steve Gadd – drums (on "I Won't Be Back")
Herbie Hancock – piano (on "I Won't Be Back")
Don Alias – conga (on "I Won't Be Back")

Recording credits
Engineer – Rudy Van Gelder
Producer - Creed Taylor
Cover photograph – Pete Turner
Liner photographs – Gene Laurents
Album design – Sibbie McDonough

Chart performance

References

External links

1974 albums
CTI Records albums
Joe Farrell albums
Albums produced by Creed Taylor
Albums recorded at Van Gelder Studio